The Investiture of the Gods, also known by its Chinese names  and  is a 16th-century Chinese novel and one of the major vernacular Chinese works in the gods and demons (shenmo) genre written during the Ming dynasty (1368–1644). Consisting of 100 chapters, it was first published in book form between 1567 and 1619. Another source claims it was published in 1605.  The work combines elements of history, folklore, mythology, legends and fantasy.

The story is set in the era of the decline of the Shang dynasty (1600–1046 BC) and the rise of the Zhou dynasty (1046–256 BC). It intertwines numerous elements of Chinese mythology, including deities, immortals and spirits. The authorship is attributed to Xu Zhonglin.

Plot

The novel is a romanticised retelling of the overthrow of King Zhou, the last ruler of the Shang dynasty, by Ji Fa, who would establish the Zhou dynasty in its place. The story integrates oral and written tales of many Chinese mythological figures who are involved in the struggle as well. These figures include human heroes, immortals, and various spirits (usually represented in avatar form, such as vixens and pheasants, and occasionally as inanimate objects such as a pipa).

Bewitched by his concubine Daji, who is actually a vixen spirit disguised as a beautiful woman, King Zhou of Shang oppresses his people and persecutes those who oppose him, including those who dare to speak up to him. Ji Fa (King Wu of Zhou), assisted by his strategist Jiang Ziya, rallies an army to overthrow the tyrant and restore peace and order. Throughout the story, battles are waged between the kingdoms of Shang and Zhou, with both sides calling upon various supernatural beings – deities, immortals, demons, spirits, and humans with magical abilities – to aid them in the war. Yuanshi Tianzun ("Primeval Lord of Heaven") bestows upon Jiang Ziya the Fengshen Bang, a list that empowers him to invest the gods of Heaven. The heroes of Zhou and some of their fallen enemies from Shang are eventually endowed with heavenly ranking and essentially elevated as gods, hence the title of the novel.

Some anecdotes
The novel features many stories in which various supernatural beings enter the human realm and change the fates of mortals and the course of history with their magical powers. The following are some of the better-known of its component anecdotes.

Nüwa and King Zhou
King Zhou visits the temple of the ancient Chinese goddess Nüwa to offer incense and pray. As he was doing so, there came a gust of wind which blew up the cover on Nüwa’s statue. He notices that the statue of the goddess is very attractive. The lewd king spouts blasphemy before the statue, "It'd be good if I could marry Her". He writes poems on the walls to express his lust for the goddess. He has offended Nüwa unknowingly and Nüwa foresees that King Zhou is destined to be the last ruler of the Shang dynasty. She sends the thousand year old vixen spirit, nine-headed pheasant spirit and jade pipa spirit to torture King Zhou, because the goddess was very angry when she saw that King Zhou could enjoy himself for 28 years. The king becomes obsessed with the spirits, who disguise themselves as beautiful women, and starts to neglect state affairs and rule with cruelty. The people suffer under his tyranny and eventually join Ji Fa to rise up and overthrow him.

Daji and Bo Yikao
King Zhou places Ji Chang, the Western Duke, under house arrest in Youli for almost seven years. Ji Chang's eldest son Bo Yikao comes to Zhaoge (present-day Hebi, Henan) to plead with King Zhou to release his father. Daji falls in love with Bo Yikao and requests the king to permit Bo Yikao to teach her how to play the guqin. Daji attempts to seduce Bo Yikao but he rejects and ridicules her. The irate Daji complains to King Zhou that Bo Yikao molested her and insulted the king through his music. The king is furious and he has Bo Yikao executed, minced into pieces and made into meat pies, and served to his father. Ji Chang knows divination and has already foreseen his son's fate. He suppresses his sorrow and consumes the meat cakes. After that incident, King Zhou lowers his guard against Ji Chang and allows the latter to return home. Ji Chang builds up his forces and plans to avenge his son.

Ji Chang and Jiang Ziya
Jiang Ziya is an apprentice of master of the Kunlun Mountains Yuanshi Tianzun. He leaves his master at the age of 72. He only uses a straight fishhook without bait, three feet above the water, for angling. His neighbours are puzzled by his odd method of fishing. They ask him out of curiosity. Jiang replies, "What I'm angling is not a single fish, but the king and the great many vassals. Only those who really wish to go on the hook will be fished by me." Jiang Ziya means that he is waiting for a wise ruler who recognises his talent and needs him.

Some people tell Ji Chang about Jiang and Ji Chang becomes interested in him. One day, Ji Chang pays a visit to Jiang Ziya. Jiang demands that the duke helps him pull his cart. Ji Chang does so and stops pulling after he has moved 800 steps forwards. Jiang Ziya tells the duke that his future kingdom (the Zhou dynasty) will exist for 800 years. Ji Chang wishes to pull the cart for a few more steps but he is too exhausted to move forward. Jiang Ziya becomes the chancellor of Zhou afterwards and assists Ji Chang in building his kingdom.

Bi Gan loses his heart
From the prophecy revealed by the oracle bones, Jiang Ziya predicts that King Zhou's loyal and benevolent courtier, Bi Gan, will die soon. He gives a charm to Bi Gan. One night, during a banquet hosted by King Zhou, several "immortals" appear and the king is delighted to see them. The "immortals" are actually Daji's fellow fox spirits in disguise, and Bi Gan, who is also present at the banquet, senses something amiss. Bi Gan's suspicions are confirmed when the fox spirits reveal their tails unknowingly after getting drunk. Bi Gan gathers a group of soldiers and they track the fox spirits back to their den and kill all of them. Bi Gan uses the foxes' hides to make a cloak and presents it to King Zhou. Daji is horrified and saddened when she sees the cloak, and she secretly plots vengeance on Bi Gan.

Not long later, Daji tells King Zhou that she has a heart attack and only a "delicate seven-aperture heart" can relieve her agony. No one in the palace has that type of heart except Bi Gan, who is revered as a saint. Bi Gan swallows the charm given by Jiang Ziya, grabs his heart, pulls it out of his body, and presents it to King Zhou. Bi Gan does not die immediately nor sheds a single drop of blood. Instead, he walks out of the palace and follows Jiang Ziya's instructions to go straight home without looking back.

When he is only a few steps away from home, a female huckster yells from behind, "Hey! Cheap cabbages without stems (hearts)!" (The "heart" rhetorically refers to the stem of the plant). Bi Gan turns around, then asks the huckster in curiosity, "How can there be cabbages without stems?" The woman puts on an evil grin and replies, "You're right, sir. Cabbages cannot live without stems just as men cannot live without hearts." Bi Gan shouts, collapses, and dies. The huckster is actually the jade pipa spirit in disguise.

The Foursome of Nine Dragon Island
The Foursome of Nine Dragon Island are a set of four fictional characters . These four individuals are Wang Mo, Yang Sen, Gao Youqian, and Li Xingba; each of them are renowned as superior men. These four superior men would later be personally recruited by Grand Old Master Wen Zhong in an attempt to put an end to the threat of King Wu.

Creations of Daji
This is a list of the variety of projects created by Daji throughout the novel Fengshen Yanyi by Lu Xixing and Xu Zhonglin.

The Bronze Toaster
The Bronze Toaster, intended as a torture and execution device, was first suggested by Daji. It is a bronze cylindrical device that is over twenty feet tall and eight feet wide. It has two wheels on each side so it can be moved around. There are three layers of charcoal over three layers of burning fire inside the device. The victims were stripped naked and tied before being placed into the pit. The pit was used to execute Grand Counselor Mei Bo. Big fans were used to intensify the fire during the execution of Mei Bo.

The Bronze Toaster was only mentioned in Chapter 6.

The Snake Pit
The Snake Pit, another torture device, was first introduced in Chapter 17. The 25-feet wide snake pit was dug beneath the Star-Picking Belvedere. Venomous spiders and exceedingly venomous snakes were put into the pit. Once this pit was finally constructed, seventy-two unfortunate maidens, with their hair shaved and clothes stripped, were tied and thrown into the pit to feed the snakes.

This torturing device was mentioned multiple times after Chapter 17.

The Wine Pool and Meat Forest
The Wine Pool and Meat Forest were introduced in Chapter 17. The Wine Pool was located on the left side of the Snake Pit, while the Meat Forest was on the right, thus forming a small park before the Star-Picking Belvedere. Fifty maidens and fifty eunuchs were chosen and tied together to form 50 pairs. Each individual pair would then get thrown into the pool and would be asked to drink the pool's wine while performing swimming tricks. Once each pair is readily drunk, they would be put into the Meat Forest to enjoy an abundance of cooked duck, roasted pig, etc. By sunset a few pairs would then be beaten to a bloody pulp and secretly fed to Daji to ease her need for human flesh.

This method of torture, created by Daji, was first mentioned in Chapter 17, as well as multiple times afterward.

The Deer Gallery
The Deer Gallery is also mentioned in Chapter 17. Daji had chosen this Deer Gallery as an ensured way to put an end to Jiang Ziya, who had been entrusted to complete the impossible mission of creating the Deer Gallery itself. This large tower-like structure was forty-nine feet in height (double the size of the Star-Picking Belvedere), fully equipped with columns of jade, floors of marble, roofs and ceilings of legendary jewels, and railings of great pearls and sea corals.

Criticism
Although the novel is now seen  as one of the towering works of Chinese literature, it was not always appreciated as such. In comparing the work to other Chinese novels of the past, Lu Xun remarked in his 1924 book A Brief History of Chinese Fiction that Fengshen Yanyi "lacks the realism of Water Margin and the imaginative brilliance of Journey to the West."

Translations

 This is an abridged translation containing only the first 46 chapters out of 100.

The book was also translated to Dutch as Feng Shen: De Verheffing tot Goden by Nio Joe Lan (Jakarta, 1940).

Adaptations
The novel has a significant impact on Chinese and Japanese popular culture. It has been adapted in various forms, including television series, manhua, manga, and video games. Some of the more notable adaptations are listed below:

 Unabridged 1970 Pingshu radio program by Yuan Kuocheng, consisting of the entire Fēngshén Yǎnyì in 200 episodes.
 The Story of Chinese Gods, a 1976 hand-drawn animated film.
 God's Parade, a 1981 TVB TV series which has a song performed by Adam Cheng.
 The Founding of the Zhou Dynasty, the first story arc of the Hong Kong manhua series Legend of Emperors by Wong Yuk-long.
 Hoshin Engi, a Japanese manga and anime series based on the novel.
 Gods of Honour, a 2001 Hong Kong television series produced by TVB as attributed to God's Parade.
 , a 2002 video game by Koei loosely based on the book.
 The Legend and the Hero, a 2007 Chinese television series. It was followed by a 2009 sequel, The Legend and the Hero 2.
 Warriors Orochi, a video game series produced by Koei. It features three characters from the novel – Daji (called Da Ji in the game), Nezha, and Jiang Ziya (called Taigong Wang in the game) – as playable characters.
The Investiture of the Gods (2014 TV series), a 2014 Chinese live action series produced by Shandong Television and starring Sammul Chan and Viann Zhang.
 League of Gods, a 2016 3D Chinese movie produced by China Star Entertainment Group, starring Jacky Heung as the main character Lei Zhenzi, Jet Li as Jiang Ziya, Tony Leung Ka-fai as King Zhou of Shang, Louis Koo as Mahamayuri, Huang Xiaoming as Erlang Shen, Angelababy as the mermaid, Fan Bingbing as Daji, and Wen Zhang as Nezha.
 Chronicles of the God's Order, an ongoing Hong Kong manhua.
 Ne Zha, a 2019 Chinese 3D animation film.
 Investiture of the Gods (2019 TV series), a 2019 Chinese live action series produced by Mango Studio and starring Wang Likun, Luo Jin, Zhang Bo, Yu Hewei, Deng Lun, and Collin Chou.
 Jiang Ziya, a 2020 Chinese 3D animation film.
 New Gods: Nezha Reborn, a 2021 Chinese 3D animation film.

See also

 Chinese mythology
 Religion in China

Notes

References

Citations

Sources 
 General

 .

External links

 Creation of the Gods: A Somewhat Less Than Critical Commentary

 
Shenmo novels
Taoist texts
16th-century Chinese novels
Novels set in the Shang dynasty
Chinese novels adapted into films
Chinese novels adapted into television series
Ming dynasty novels
Novels set in the Zhou dynasty
Chinese classic novels
Epic novels
Chinese fantasy novels
Chinese mythology
Novels set in the 11th century BC
Novels set in Henan